Pupinella is a genus of land snails in the superfamily Cyclophoroidea (according to the taxonomy of the Gastropoda by Bouchet & Rocroi, 2005).

Species
Species within the genus Pupinella include:

 Pupinella brazierae E. A. Smith, 1887
 Pupinella frednaggsi Thach & F. Huber, 2017
 Pupinella funatoi Pilsbry, 1901
 Pupinella hedleyi E. A. Smith, 1897
 Pupinella humilis Hombron & Jacquinot, 1846
 Pupinella luteola Brancsik, 1895
 Pupinella mansuyi Dautzenberg & H. Fischer, 1908
Pupinella masuhowaruensis Ueng & Chiou, 2004
 Pupinella occulta Benthem Jutting, 1963
 Pupinella oshimae Pilsbry, 1901
 Pupinella pupiniformis G. B. Sowerby I, 1842
 Pupinella rufa H. Adams, 1866
 Pupinella schaubi Benthem Jutting, 1963
 Pupinella straminea Benthem Jutting, 1963
 Pupinella strubelli E. A. Smith, 1896
 Pupinella swinhoei H. Adams, 1866
 Pupinella tapparonei Hedley, 1891
 Pupinella xanthostoma Benthem Jutting, 1933

References

 Zoologicus info